The following outline is provided as an overview of and topical guide to Greenland:

Greenland – autonomous Nordic nation that is a constituent country of the Kingdom of Denmark. Greenland comprises the Island of Greenland and adjacent islands located between the Arctic and Atlantic Oceans, east of the Canadian Arctic Archipelago. Though physiographically and ethnically an Arctic island nation associated with the continent of North America, politically and historically, Greenland is associated with Europe, specifically Iceland, Norway, and Denmark.  In 1978, Denmark granted home rule to Greenland, making it an equal member of the Danish Realm. Greenland is, by area, the world's largest island which is not a continent in its own right.

General reference

 Pronunciation: 
 Common English country name: Greenland
 Official English country name: Greenland of the Kingdom of Denmark
 Common endonym(s): Kalaallit Nunaat
 Official endonym(s): Kalaallit Nunaat
 Adjectival(s): Greenlandic (disambiguation)
 Demonym(s): Greenlander(s)
 Etymology: Name of Greenland
 ISO country codes: GL, GRL, 304
 ISO region codes: See ISO 3166-2:GL
 Internet country code top-level domain: .gl

Geography of Greenland 

Geography of Greenland
 Greenland is: an autonomous territory of the Kingdom of Denmark
 Location:
 Northern Hemisphere and Western Hemisphere
 North America (though not on the mainland)
 Between the Arctic Ocean and Atlantic Ocean
 Time zones:
 Danmarkshavn and Ittoqqortoormiit – UTC+00
 Pituffik – UTC-03
 Rest of Greenland – UTC-02
 Extreme points of Greenland
 High:  Gunnbjørn Fjeld  – highest point in the Arctic
 Low:  Arctic Ocean and North Atlantic Ocean 0 m
 Land boundaries:   
 Coastline:  44,087 km
 Population of Greenland: 56,344

 Area of Greenland: 2,166,086 km2
 Atlas of Greenland

Environment of Greenland 

 Climate of Greenland
 Environmental issues in Greenland
 Renewable energy in Greenland
 Geology of Greenland
 Protected areas of Greenland
 Biosphere reserves in Greenland
 National parks of Greenland
 Wildlife of Greenland
 Flora of Greenland
 Flora and fauna of Greenland
 Fauna of Greenland
 Birds of Greenland
 Mammals of Greenland
 Flora and fauna of Greenland

Natural geographic features of Greenland 

 Canyons of Greenland
 Greenland's Grand Canyon
 Fjords of Greenland
 Glaciers of Greenland
 Islands of Greenland
 Lakes of Greenland
 Mountains of Greenland
 Rivers of Greenland
 Waterfalls of Greenland
 Valleys of Greenland
 World Heritage Sites in Greenland

Regions of Greenland 

Regions of Greenland

Ecoregions of Greenland 

List of ecoregions in Greenland

Administrative divisions of Greenland 

Administrative divisions of Greenland
 Counties of Greenland
 Municipalities of Greenland

Counties of Greenland 

Counties of Greenland

Municipalities of Greenland 

Municipalities of Greenland
 Capital of Greenland: Nuuk
 Cities of Greenland

Demography of Greenland 

Demographics of Greenland

Government and politics of Greenland 

Politics of Greenland
 Form of government: parliamentary representative democratic Danish dependency
 Capital of Greenland: Nuuk
 Elections in Greenland

 Political parties in Greenland

Branches of the government of Greenland 

Government of Greenland

Executive branch of the government of Greenland 
 Head of state: Queen of Denmark, Queen Margrethe II, represented by High Commissioner of Greenland, Mikaela Engell
 Head of government: Prime Minister of Greenland, Kim Kielsen

Legislative branch of the government of Greenland 

 Landsting (unicameral)

Judicial branch of the government of Greenland 

Court system of Greenland
 Landsret

Foreign relations of Greenland 

Foreign relations of Greenland
 Diplomatic missions in Greenland
 Diplomatic missions of Greenland
 Greenland and the European Union

International organization membership 
The government of Greenland is a member of:
Arctic Council
Nordic Council (NC)
Nordic Investment Bank (NIB)
Universal Postal Union (UPU)
 Human rights in Greenland
 LGBT rights in Greenland
 Freedom of religion in Greenland
 Law enforcement in Greenland

Military of Greenland 

Military of Greenland
 Command
 Commander-in-chief:
 Ministry of Defence of Greenland: None, Island Command Greenland is de facto defense command
 Forces
 Greenlandic Coast Guard
 Army of Greenland: None, Defense is the responsibility of Denmark
 Navy of Greenland: None, Defense is the responsibility of Denmark
 Air Force of Greenland: None, Defense is the responsibility of Denmark
 Special forces of Greenland: None, Defense is the responsibility of Denmark
 Greenland in World War II

Local government in Greenland 

Administrative divisions of Greenland

 Municipalities:
 Qaasuitsup
 Qeqqata
 Sermersooq
 Kujalleq
 Northeast Greenland National Park

History of Greenland 

 Military history of Greenland

Culture of Greenland 

Culture of Greenland
 Architecture of Greenland
 Cuisine of Greenland
 Festivals in Greenland
 Languages of Greenland
 Media in Greenland
 National symbols of Greenland
 Coat of arms of Greenland
 Flag of Greenland
 National anthem of Greenland
 People of Greenland
 Public holidays in Greenland
 Records of Greenland
 Religion in Greenland
 Christianity in Greenland
 World Heritage Sites in Greenland

Art in Greenland 
 Art in Greenland
 List of Greenlandic artists
 Cinema of Greenland
 Literature of Greenland
 Music of Greenland
 Television in Greenland
 Theatre in Greenland

Sports in Greenland 

Sports in Greenland
 Arctic Winter Games 2016
 Association football in Greenland
 Greenland at the Olympics
 Greenland men's national handball team
 Greenlandic National Badminton Championships

Economy and infrastructure of Greenland 

Economy of Greenland
 Economic rank, by nominal GDP (2007): 157th (one hundred and fifty seventh)
 Agriculture in Greenland
 Banking in Greenland
 Bank of Greenland
 Communications in Greenland
 Internet in Greenland
 Companies of Greenland
Currency of Greenland: Krone
ISO 4217: DKK
 Energy in Greenland
 Energy policy of Greenland
 Oil industry in Greenland
 Mining in Greenland
Gemstone industry in Greenland
 Greenland Stock Exchange
 Tourism in Greenland
 Transport in Greenland
 Airports in Greenland

Education in Greenland 

Education in Greenland

See also

Greenland
Index of Greenland-related articles
List of Greenland-related topics
List of international rankings
Outline of North America
Outline of Denmark
Outline of geography

References

External links

 Official Government Site (in English)
 Official Greenland tourism information
 CIA World Factbook
 Statistics Greenland
 Greenland Map
 Greenland Dumps Ice into Sea at Faster Pace
 
 

 News
 BBC: Country profile
 BBC: Timeline
 Dallas Morning News article by Dave Levinthal, Staff Writer

Greenland